The Serbia and Montenegro men's national under-20 basketball team was a national basketball team of Serbia and Montenegro, administered by the Basketball Federation of Serbia and Montenegro. It represented the country in men's international under-20 basketball competitions. The team won a bronze medal at the 2005 FIBA Europe Under-20 Championship and a gold medal at the 2006 FIBA Europe Under-20 Championship.

References

External links
Archived records of Serbia and Montenegro team participations

Basketball in Serbia and Montenegro
Basketball
Men's national under-20 basketball teams